Middleton is a predominantly industrial and wholesale suburb of Christchurch, New Zealand. It is located in the west of the city, between Wigram and Addington, and immediately to the south of Upper Riccarton. 

Middleton's boundaries are typically defined by major roads. The western and southern boundaries are State Highways 73 and 76 respectively, with State Highway 75 continuing from the junction of the two at the southern tip of Middleton. Blenheim Road, a major Christchurch thoroughfare with multiple retail and commercial premises, forms much of the northern limit, while Matipo Street generally defines the eastern boundary, with Addington Raceway and Horncastle Arena just beyond in neighbouring Addington.

The suburb is also home to a large rail yard operated by KiwiRail, connecting Christchurch to both the South Island Main Trunk Railway and the Midland Line.

Demographics

Middleton had a population of 189 at the 2018 New Zealand census, a decrease of 24 people (-11.3%) since the 2013 census, and an increase of 15 people (8.6%) since the 2006 census. There were 69 households. There were 126 males and 60 females, giving a sex ratio of 2.1 males per female. The median age was 27.4 years (compared with 37.4 years nationally), with 12 people (6.3%) aged under 15 years, 93 (49.2%) aged 15 to 29, 66 (34.9%) aged 30 to 64, and 15 (7.9%) aged 65 or older.

Ethnicities were 55.6% European/Pākehā, 4.8% Māori, 11.1% Pacific peoples, 28.6% Asian, and 3.2% other ethnicities (totals add to more than 100% since people could identify with multiple ethnicities).

The proportion of people born overseas was 46.0%, compared with 27.1% nationally.

Although some people objected to giving their religion, 44.4% had no religion, 30.2% were Christian, 11.1% were Hindu, 1.6% were Muslim, 1.6% were Buddhist and 4.8% had other religions.

Of those at least 15 years old, 39 (22.0%) people had a bachelor or higher degree, and 18 (10.2%) people had no formal qualifications. The median income was $18,900, compared with $31,800 nationally. The employment status of those at least 15 was that 78 (44.1%) people were employed full-time, 30 (16.9%) were part-time, and 12 (6.8%) were unemployed.

References

Suburbs of Christchurch